Showtime Arabia was Showtime Networks' pay television service in the Middle East and  North Africa. It was a joint venture between Kuwaiti holding company KIPCO (79% stake) and American media firm Viacom Inc. (21% stake). The company was incorporated in the Cayman Islands and had its headquarters at Dubai Media City in Dubai, United Arab Emirates.

Showtime Arabia was one of three pay TV networks in the Middle East and North Africa, it offered motion pictures, sporting events and original content, some of which was localized. It had the exclusive rights to broadcast the Barclays Premier League in the Middle East and North Africa. On 12 July 2009 the company announced a merger with competitor Orbit Communications Company to form Orbit Showtime Network (OSN).

Technical

When Showtime launched, it some of its channels were  TMC, MTV, VH1, Nickelodeon, TV Land, Paramount, Style, Discovery and Hallmark. Gulf DTH F.Z. L.L.C. was the operating company behind the digital pay TV broadcaster, Showtime Arabia. Its broadcast facilities were based at Dubai Media City in the United Arab Emirates and its uplink teleport station is Samacom, the monopoly uplink provider in the UAE. Showtime Arabia used Irdeto Access Conditional Access technology, to encrypt its DTH channels over satellite and the OpenTV interactive platform that runs on primarily UEC Multi-Media set-top boxes.

Showtime Arabia Channel lineup

   *  43 channels** + 1 promotional channel 
  ** 12 general entertainment channels, seven movie channels, five sports channels, five documentary channels, five kids channels, four pay-per-view channels, three music channels, and three news channels

Orbit Communications Company merger
On 12 July 2009 Showtime Arabia and Orbit Communications Company announced a merger that created the “biggest Pay-TV platform” in the Middle East and North Africa.

The newly formed company is an equal partnership that would offer 70 exclusive channels featuring new movies, sports, series, Arabic content and international shows.

New customers can subscribe to packages featuring Showtime Arabia's and Orbit Communications Company's  programs, while existing subscribers will be able to either retain or upgrade their content. The company will offer HD channels, video on demand and other interactive services.

Logos

See also 
 Showtime around the world
 Orbit Communications Company
 Orbit Showtime Network (OSN)

References

External links 
 Orbit Showtime Network's homepage
 Packages of Orbit Showtime Network 
 Viacom's homepage
 Dubai Media City
 NileSat Satellite

1996 establishments in the United Arab Emirates
2009 disestablishments in the United Arab Emirates
Television stations in the United Arab Emirates
Mass media companies established in 1996
Mass media companies disestablished in 2009
Defunct companies of the United Arab Emirates
Mass media companies of the United Arab Emirates
Direct broadcast satellite services
Former CBS Corporation subsidiaries
Showtime Networks